The Path to Crime (Spanish:Camino al crimen) is a 1951 Argentine comedy film directed by Don Napy.

Cast
Tito Alonso		
 Juan Carlos Altavista		
 Máximo Berrondo		
 Juan Carlos Bettini	 ...	Director
 Tato Bores		
 José Canosa		
 Paula Darlan		
 Horacio Delfino		
 Julio Heredia		
 David Lederman	 ...  (as Dawid Lederman)
 Diego Marcote	 ...	Guarda de tranvía
 Justo Martinez		
 José Maurer		
 Enrique de Pedro		
 Pedro Prevosti

References

Bibliography
 Elena, Alberto & Lopez, Marina Diaz. The Cinema of Latin America. Columbia University Press, 2013.

External links
 

1951 films
1951 comedy films
Argentine comedy films
1950s Spanish-language films
Argentine black-and-white films
1950s Argentine films